The Box Hill Reporter was a weekly newspaper for the Box Hill region of Victoria, Australia. Exact dates of the newspaper's production are unconfirmed, but are estimated as 1889–1918.

It has since been superseded by the local newspaper, published by Leader Community Newspapers.

References

External links
 

Defunct newspapers published in Victoria (Australia)